The 2013 International Rules Series (officially the 2013 Irish Daily Mail International Rules Series) was the 17th International Rules Series contested between Gaelic footballers from Ireland and Australian footballers from Australia. Ireland entered the 2013 series as defending champions, whilst Australia were, for the first time in the series, represented by an exclusively Indigenous team, known as the Indigenous All-Stars.

The series was played over two Test matches, with Ireland winning both Test matches to take the series 2–0 and achieve a record aggregate win of 173–72 points. The Gaelic Athletic Association announced the schedule for the series in February 2013, with Breffni Park in Cavan chosen for the first Test match and Croke Park in Dublin chosen to host the second Test match. It marked just the second time that an international rules match was played in Cavan, or for that matter at a venue situated in the jurisdiction of the Ulster GAA. Breffni Park had previously hosted the first Test in the 2006 Ladies' International Rules Series.

Broadcast and sponsorship
The GAA announced as part of their management team selection in March 2013 that the Irish Daily Mail newspaper would return as Irish team and series sponsor whilst Irish language TV network TG4 would again be the official broadcaster of the series in Ireland. In making the announcement, GAA President Liam O'Neill stated that “TG4 [and the Irish Daily Mail] are...valued long term partners of the GAA and we are looking forward to working with them to bring the games to the widest audience possible.” As part of their live coverage of the two Test matches, TG4 announced they would also provide replays of previous international rules matches in September and October for Irish audiences.

The AFL announced as part of their extended squad selection in August 2013 that Australian supermarket chain Coles and Indigenous health and wellbeing group National Aboriginal Community Controlled Health Organisation (NACCHO) would be the official partners of the Indigenous All-Stars. Both groups are featured on the newly designed team guernsey. Australian free-to-air TV network 7mate was the exclusive broadcaster of the series in Australia, showing both matches on a slight delay and replaying them as well.

Background

Irish management and captain
In February 2013, the GAA confirmed that former Roscommon footballer Paul Earley would succeed Anthony Tohill as manager of the Irish team. GAA President Liam O'Neill said the Association was "delighted that someone of the standing and calibre of Paul Earley will lead the Irish challenge" and praised his extensive experience in both international rules and Australian football, Earley having represented Ireland in the 1987 series and played briefly for the Melbourne Football Club in 1984. Earley announced his management team in March, appointing Séamus McCarthy (Tipperary), Jarlath Fallon (Galway) and Tony Scullion (Derry) as selectors and former Cavan footballer and current GWS Giants high-performance manager Nicholas Walsh as conditioning coach. On October 3, Earley announced that former All-Ireland Donegal captain Michael Murphy would be captain of the Irish side for the series. This created a headache for young Murphy, as the Series was scheduled to clash with the final of the 2013 Donegal Senior Football Championship, which his club Glenswilly contested. On October 8, Earley announced an Irish squad of 29, with 15 of the national counties being represented in the side. This number of counties represented was reduced to 11 when Earley named his final 23-man match-day squad for the first Test in Cavan. Despite having a club county final scheduled the following day, captain Michael Murphy was named as a starting player. Ahead of the second test, former Irish vice-captain Ciarán McKeever and veteran Kildare footballer Johnny Doyle were included in the squad, replacing the injured Finian Hanley and Mayo footballer Aidan O'Shea, who had club commitments.

Australian Indigenous team

In May 2013, AFL CEO Andrew Demetriou confirmed to Channel 9's The Footy Show that the AFL was considering the possibility of sending an all-Indigenous team made up of exclusively Aboriginal footballers to Ireland for the 2013 series. Previously, an all-Indigenous team made up of some of the best such players in the AFL has competed in pre-season exhibition matches in the Northern Territory to relatively little public exposure. In late May, respected sports journalist Caroline Wilson penned an article in The Age claiming that the plan now "seemed certain" as a result of support from star Indigenous players Adam Goodes and Lance Franklin. The decision was made official in July, when the AFL announced that the Indigenous All-Stars would indeed represent Australia, with Deputy CEO Gillon McLachlan justifying the move by contending that the series needed reinvigoration and that the commitment of senior indigenous players had been significant in forming the new concept.

The AFL announced a 33-man extended squad on 29 August, which included high-profile names such as Daniel Wells and Shaun Burgoyne alongside multiple All-Australian winners Franklin and Goodes; however, on October 8, the squad was trimmed to a touring party of 21 and featured a rather makeshift lineup of both high-profile Indigenous players and several lesser-known players who were not included in the original squad Lance Franklin, who would otherwise have been captain, was ruled out of the second Test due to commitments in Australia. Paddy Ryder may be a late inclusion in the team. – including two players who had never previously played a senior level AFL game.

Daniel Wells was the Australian captain; Aaron Davey was vice-captain. Former Sydney Swans and Indigenous player Michael O'Loughlin coached and managed the team, with former Australian coach Rodney Eade, former senior AFL and GAA player Tadhg Kennelly, and ex-Adelaide Crows and Indigenous player Andrew McLeod joining him on the panel. Prior to the opening Test, the Australian side defeated a combined Dublin universities team by a score of 62–23.

Squads

 Coach: Paul Earley (Roscommon)

 Coach: Michael O'Loughlin

†These players have never played a senior AFL game prior to this series 
**These players participated in only one of the two test matches

Series results

See also
 International rules football
 Gaelic football
 Australian rules football
 Indigenous All-Stars
 Relationship between Gaelic football and Australian rules football

References

International Rules series
International Rules Series
International Rules series
International sports competitions hosted by Ireland